34 Persei is a binary star system in the northern constellation of Perseus. It is visible to the naked eye as a faint, blue-white hued point of light with a combined apparent visual magnitude of 4.67. The system is located approximately 540 light years away from the Sun based on parallax, but it is drifting closer with a radial velocity of −3.5 km/s. It is a likely member of the Alpha Persei Cluster.

The primary member, designated component A, is a B-type main-sequence star with a stellar classification of B3V and visual magnitude 4.76. It is an estimated 29 million years old with a high rate of spin, showing a projected rotational velocity of 200 km/s. The star has 6.9 times the mass of the Sun and about 3.1 times the Sun's radius. It is radiating 671 times the Sun's luminosity from its photosphere at an effective temperature of 16,421 K.

References

B-type main-sequence stars
Binary stars
Alpha Persei Cluster

Perseus (constellation)
BD+49 945
Persei, 34
021428
016244
1044